Paraschistura cristata also known as the Turkmenian crested loach is a species of stone loach found only in freshwater streams of Turkmenistan, Iran and Afghanistan in Central Asia.

References

cristata
Fish of Asia
Taxa named by Lev Berg
Fish described in 1898